Nancy Raven (also Nancy Taylor) (December 25, 1872 – March 25, 1957) was a Natchez storyteller from Braggs, Oklahoma and one of the last two native speakers of the Natchez language.

Her father was Cherokee and her mother Natchez, and she learned Natchez at home. She never learned English, but was trilingual in Natchez, Cherokee and Creek.

In 1907 she worked with anthropologist John R. Swanton who collected information about Natchez religion, and in the 1930s she worked extensively with linguist Mary Haas who collected grammatical information and texts using an interpreter. Among the stories she told Mary Haas was one called "The Woman Who was a Fox". Sometimes she used the surname Taylor, which she had taken from her second husband.

She married four times; she had one son Adam Levi from her first marriage, with her second husband Will Taylor she received land allotments from the Dawes Commission in 1907. She was soon widowed, then married a man named Waters, and by  1920 was again widowed and married Albert Raven, a man about whom little is known. In the 1930s she appears to have been once again widowed. In 1930 she sold her land allotment. She was the biological cousin of the other last speaker of Natchez, Watt Sam, who in Natchez kinship terminology was her classificatory nephew. Among the Natchez, the language was generally passed down matrilineally, but at her death Nancy Raven had no surviving children, her only son Adam Levi having died from tuberculosis at age 20 in 1915.

References

External links
Index of Mary Haas' notes from her work with Nancy Raven

Natchez people
People from Braggs, Oklahoma
Last known speakers of a Native American language
19th-century Native Americans
1872 births
1957 deaths
19th-century Native American women
20th-century Native American women
20th-century Native Americans